Discula tetrica is a species of air-breathing land snail, a terrestrial pulmonate gastropod mollusk in the family Geomitridae.

This species is endemic to Bugio, Madeira, Portugal.

Discula tetrica is listed as Critically endangered in the 1996 IUCN Red List, but it is considered to be possibly extinct.

References

Molluscs of Madeira
Discula
Extinct gastropods
Taxa named by Richard Thomas Lowe
Gastropods described in 1862
Taxonomy articles created by Polbot